Xu Wanquan (born 19 April 1993) is a Chinese football player.

Club career
In 2012, Xu Wanquan started his professional footballer career with  Liaoning Whowin in the Chinese Super League. 
In July 2012, Xu moved to China League Two side Xinjiang Youth on a one-year loan deal.
He would eventually make his league debut for Liaoning on 2 November 2014 in a game against Shanghai Shenhua.

On 14 March 2016, Xu transferred to China League Two side Chengdu Qbao. On 8 January 2016 the club relocated to the city of Chengdu and he would move with them as they renamed themselves Chengdu Qbao. Chengdu Qbao withdrew from League Two in 2018 when the Qbao Group was under investigation with illegal fund raising. On 20 March 2018, the club was taken over by Chengdu Better City Investment Group Co., Ltd. and Xu would stay with the club as they participated in the 2018 Chinese Champions League.

Career statistics 
Statistics accurate as of match played 31 December 2020.

References

External links
 

1993 births
Living people
Chinese footballers
Footballers from Dalian
Liaoning F.C. players
Chengdu Better City F.C. players
Chinese Super League players
China League Two players
Association football defenders